Bazaya,  Bāzāia or Bāzāiu, inscribed mba-za-a-a and of uncertain meaning, was the ruler of Assyria  1649 to 1622 BC, the 52nd listed on the Assyrian King List, succeeding Iptar-Sin, to whom he was supposedly a great-uncle. He reigned for twenty-eight years and has left no known inscriptions.

Biography

The Assyrian king lists give Bazaya’s five predecessors as father-son successors, although all reigned during a fifty-two period, stretching genealogical credibility. All three extant copies give his father as Bel-bani, the second in the sequence, whose reign had ended forty-one years earlier and who had been the great-grandfather of his immediate predecessor. The literal reading of the list was challenged by Landsberger who suggested that the three preceding kings, Libaya, Sharma-Adad I and Iptar-Sin may have been Bel-bani's brothers.

The Synchronistic Kinglist gives his Babylonian counterpart as Peshgaldaramesh of the Sealand Dynasty. He was succeeded by Lullaya, a usurper, whose brief reign was followed by that of Bāzāiu’s own son, Shu-Ninua.

Inscriptions

References

17th-century BC Assyrian kings